Tane Topia (born 18 November 1976) is a New Zealand former cricketer. He played one List A match for Auckland in 2000/01.

See also
 List of Auckland representative cricketers

References

External links
 

1976 births
Living people
New Zealand cricketers
Auckland cricketers
Cricketers from Auckland